Neil Fraser (or similar) is the name of:

Mad Professor (born 1955), British music producer born Neil Joseph Stephen Fraser in Guyana
Neil Fraser, guitarist with Asphalt Ribbons and Tindersticks
Neil Fraser (civil servant), Canadian civil servant sacked for his opposition to the metric system
Neil Fraser (Canadian football) from 1984 CFL Draft
Neal Fraser, Australian tennis player
Neil Frazer (artist), New Zealand artist and 1992 Frances Hogkins Fellow
Neil Frazer (karate)
Neil Frazer (rugby league), English rugby league player (Workington Town)

See also 
 Fraser (surname)